This is a list of British Army cavalry and infantry regiments that were created by Childers reforms in 1881, a continuation of the Cardwell reforms. It also indicates the cavalry amalgamations that would take place forty years later as part of the Government cuts of the early 1920s.

Cavalry

Household Cavalry 

1st Life Guards
2nd Life Guards
Royal Horse Guards (The Blues)

Cavalry of the Line

Dragoon Guards
1st King's Dragoon Guards
2nd Dragoon Guards (Queen's Bays)
3rd (Prince of Wales's) Dragoon Guards
4th Royal Irish Dragoon Guards 
5th (Princess Charlotte of Wales's) Dragoon Guards 
Carabiniers (6th Dragoon Guards) 
7th (The Princess Royal's) Dragoon Guards

Dragoons, Hussars and Lancers
1st Royal Dragoons
2nd Dragoons (Royal Scots Greys)
3rd The King's Own Hussars
4th Queen's Own Hussars
5th Royal Irish Lancers
6th (Inniskilling) Dragoons 
7th Queen's Own Hussars
8th King's Royal Irish Hussars
9th Queen's Royal Lancers
10th Royal Hussars (Prince of Wales's Own)
11th Hussars (Prince Albert's Own)
12th (Prince of Wales's Royal) Lancers
13th Hussars
14th King's Hussars
15th The King's Hussars 
16th The Queen's Lancers 
17th Lancers (Duke of Cambridge's Own)
18th Hussars 
19th Hussars 
20th Hussars 
21st Hussars (Lancers from 1897)

Support Arms
Royal Regiment of Artillery
Corps of Royal Engineers
Royal Horse Artillery

Infantry

Foot Guards
Grenadier Guards
Coldstream Guards
Scots Guards

Line Infantry (In order of precedence)
Royal Scots (Lothian Regiment)
1st (The Royal) Regiment of Foot
Queen's (Royal West Surrey Regiment)
2nd (The Queen's Royal) Regiment of Foot
Buffs (East Kent Regiment)
3rd (The East Kent) Regiment of Foot
King's Own (Royal Lancaster Regiment)
4th (The King's Own Royal) Regiment of Foot
Northumberland Fusiliers
5th Regiment of Foot (Northumberland Fusiliers)
Royal Warwickshire Regiment
6th (Royal 1st Warwickshire) Regiment of Foot
Royal Fusiliers (City of London Regiment)
7th (Derbyshire) Regiment of Foot
King's (Liverpool Regiment)
8th (The King's) Regiment of Foot
Norfolk Regiment - Royal title in 1935 as part of Silver Jubilee
9th (The East Norfolk) Regiment of Foot
The Lincolnshire Regiment - gained Royal title in 1946 for World War II service
10th (The North Lincolnshire) Regiment of Foot
Devonshire Regiment
11th (The North Devonshire) Regiment of Foot
Suffolk Regiment
12th (The East Suffolk) Regiment of Foot
Prince Albert's (Somersetshire Light Infantry)
13th (1st Somersetshire)(Prince Albert's Light Infantry) Regiment of Foot
Prince of Wales's Own (West Yorkshire Regiment)
14th (Buckinghamshire, The Prince of Wales's Own) Regiment of Foot
East Yorkshire Regiment
15th (The Yorkshire East Riding) Regiment of Foot
Bedfordshire Regiment
16th (The Bedfordshire) Regiment of Foot
Leicestershire Regiment - gained Royal title in 1946 for World War II service
17th (The Leicestershire) Regiment of Foot
The Royal Irish Regiment
18th (The Royal Irish) Regiment of Foot
Princess of Wales's Own (Yorkshire Regiment)
19th (The 1st Yorkshire North Riding - Prince of Wales's Own) Regiment of Foot
Lancashire Fusiliers
20th (The East Devonshire) Regiment of Foot
Royal Scots Fusiliers
21st (Royal Scots Fusiliers) Regiment of Foot
Cheshire Regiment
22nd (The Cheshire) Regiment of Foot
Royal Welsh Fusiliers - restored archaic spelling of Welsh (Welch) in 1921
23rd Regiment of Foot (Royal Welsh Fusiliers)
South Wales Borderers
24th (The 2nd Warwickshire) Regiment of Foot
The King's Own Borderers
25th (The York) Regiment of Foot (King's Own Borderers)
The Cameronians (Scotch Rifles)
26th (The Cameronians) Regiment of Foot
90th Regiment of Foot (Perthshire Volunteers) (Light Infantry)
Royal Inniskilling Fusiliers
27th (Inniskilling) Regiment of Foot
108th Regiment of Foot (Madras Infantry)
Gloucestershire Regiment
28th (North Gloucestershire) Regiment of Foot
61st (South Gloucestershire) Regiment of Foot
Worcestershire Regiment
29th (Worcestershire) Regiment of Foot
36th (Herefordshire) Regiment of Foot
East Lancashire Regiment
30th (Cambridgeshire) Regiment of Foot
59th (2nd Nottinghamshire) Regiment of Foot
East Surrey Regiment
31st (Huntingdonshire) Regiment of Foot
70th (Surrey) Regiment of Foot
Duke of Cornwall's Light Infantry
32nd (Cornwall Light Infantry) Regiment of Foot
46th (South Devonshire) Regiment of Foot
Duke of Wellington's (West Riding Regiment)
33rd (The Duke of Wellington's) Regiment of Foot
76th Regiment of Foot
Border Regiment
34th (Cumberland) Regiment of Foot
55th (Westmorland) Regiment of Foot
Royal Sussex Regiment
35th (Royal Sussex) Regiment of Foot
107th Regiment of Foot (Bengal Light Infantry)
Hampshire Regiment - gained Royal title in 1946 for World War II service
37th (North Hampshire) Regiment of Foot
67th (South Hampshire) Regiment of Foot
South Staffordshire Regiment
38th (1st Staffordshire) Regiment of Foot
80th (Staffordshire Volunteers) Regiment of Foot
Dorsetshire Regiment
39th (Dorsetshire) Regiment of Foot
54th (West Norfolk) Regiment of Foot
Prince of Wales's Volunteers (South Lancashire Regiment)
40th (2nd Somersetshire) Regiment of Foot
82nd (The Prince of Wales's Volunteers) Regiment of Foot
Welsh Regiment
41st (The Welsh) Regiment of Foot
69th (South Lincolnshire) Regiment of Foot
Black Watch (Royal Highlanders)
42nd (Royal Highland) Regiment of Foot, The Black Watch
73rd (Perthshire) Regiment of Foot
Oxfordshire Light Infantry
43rd (Monmouthshire) Regiment of Foot
52nd (Oxfordshire) Regiment of Foot
Essex Regiment
44th (East Essex) Regiment of Foot
56th (West Essex) Regiment of Foot
Sherwood Foresters (Derbyshire Regiment)
45th (Nottinghamshire) Regiment of Foot
95th (Derbyshire) Regiment of Foot
Loyal North Lancashire Regiment
47th (The Lancashire) Regiment of Foot
81st (Loyal Lincoln Volunteers) Regiment of Foot
Northamptonshire Regiment
48th (The Northamptonshire) Regiment of Foot
58th (Rutlandshire) Regiment of Foot
Princess Charlotte of Wales's (Berkshire Regiment)
49th (Princess Charlotte of Wales's) (Hertfordshire) Regiment of Foot
66th (Berkshire) Regiment of Foot
Queen's Own (Royal West Kent Regiment)
50th (The Queen's Own) Regiment of Foot
97th (The Earl of Ulster's) Regiment of Foot
The King's Own Light Infantry (South Yorkshire Regiment)
51st Regiment of Foot (King's Own Light Infantry)
105th Regiment of Foot (Madras Light Infantry)
The King's Light Infantry (Shropshire Regiment)
53rd (The Shropshire) Regiment of Foot
85th (The King's Light Infantry) Regiment of Foot
The (Duke of Cambridge's Own) Middlesex Regiment
57th (The West Middlesex) Regiment of Foot
77th (The East Middlesex) Regiment of Foot
King's Royal Rifle Corps
60th (The King's Royal Rifle Corps) Regiment of Foot
The (Duke of Edinburgh's) Wiltshire Regiment
62nd (Wiltshire) Regiment of Foot
99th Duke of Edinburgh's (Lanarkshire) Regiment of Foot
Manchester Regiment
63rd (The West Suffolk) Regiment of Foot
96th Regiment of Foot
The (Prince of Wales's) North Staffordshire Regiment
64th (2nd Staffordshire) Regiment of Foot
98th (The Prince of Wales's) Regiment of Foot
The York and Lancaster Regiment
65th (2nd Yorkshire, North Riding) Regiment of Foot
84th (York and Lancaster) Regiment of Foot
Durham Light Infantry
68th (Durham) Regiment of Foot (Light Infantry)
106th Regiment of Foot (Bombay Light Infantry)
Highland Light Infantry
71st (Highland) Regiment of Foot (Light Infantry)
74th (Highland) Regiment of Foot
Seaforth Highlanders (Duke of Albany's/Ross-shire Buffs)
72nd (Duke of Albany's Own Highlanders) Regiment of Foot
78th (Highlanders) Regiment of Foot (The Ross-shire Buffs)
Gordon Highlanders
75th (Stirlingshire) Regiment of Foot
92nd (Gordon Highlanders) Regiment of Foot
Queen's Own Cameron Highlanders
79th (The Queen's Own Cameron Highlanders) Regiment of Foot
Royal Irish Rifles
83rd (County of Dublin) Regiment of Foot
86th (Royal County Down) Regiment of Foot
Princess Victoria's (Royal Irish Fusiliers)
87th (Royal Irish Fusiliers) Regiment of Foot
89th (The Princess Victoria's) Regiment of Foot
Connaught Rangers
88th Regiment of Foot (Connaught Rangers)
94th Regiment of Foot
Princess Louise's (Argyll and Sutherland Highlanders)
91st (Princess Louise's Argyllshire) Regiment of Foot
93rd (Sutherland Highlanders) Regiment of Foot
Prince of Wales's Leinster Regiment (Royal Canadians)
100th (Prince of Wales's Royal Canadians) Regiment of Foot
109th Regiment of Foot (Bombay Infantry)
Royal Munster Fusiliers
101st Regiment of Foot (Royal Bengal Fusiliers)
104th Regiment of Foot (Bengal Fusiliers)
Royal Dublin Fusiliers
102nd Regiment of Foot (Royal Madras Fusiliers)
103rd Regiment of Foot (Royal Bombay Fusiliers)
The Prince Consort's Own Rifle Brigade
1st West India Regiment
2nd West India Regiment

Services
Commissariat and Transport Corps (later becoming Royal Army Service Corps in 1888)
Army Hospital Corps
Army Ordnance Corps
Corps of Military Mounted Police
Corps of Army Schoolmasters
Army Chaplains' Department
Army Pay Department
Army Veterinary Department
Army Nursing Service

See also
British Army order of precedence

Regiments (1881)

19th-century history of the British Army